Fatehpur Thakiala, also known as Nakyal, is one of the three tehsils of the Kotli District in Azad Kashmir, Pakistan.

History
Fatehpur Thakiala was part of the Mendhar subdivision of Poonch before the partition of Kashmir in 1947. Fatehpur Thakiala is bounded by the Line of Control—the boundary between Indian and Pakistan administered Kashmir—on its north and east sides. The 1947–48 war between India and Pakistan divided it into two parts; one part went to Pakistan and the other became part of India. After the separation from Mendhar, it became a tehsil of the Kotli District.

The original name of the area was Thakiala, named after the native Thakial Rajputs.  It was renamed Fatehpur Thakiala to honour the late Sardar Fateh Muhammad Khan Karelvi.  It is also the birthplace of the former president and prime minister of Azad Kashmir, Sardar Sikandar Hayat Khan.

Location
The town of Nakyal is 1524 m above sea level, and is 40 km from Kotli city.

Nakyal is in a valley nearly 3 kilometres from the Line of Control. Nearby Tatapani is one of the five crossing points at the Line of Control that were opened for the exchange of relief goods between Pakistani and Indian Administered parts of Kashmir after the devastating October 8 earthquake.

Demographics
The Gujjar are one of the major ethnic groups in Fatehpur.  The Gujjar clans are the Kallas, Bagri, Bajar, Bhumbla, Bjarh, Chandpuri, Chauhan, Chechi, Hans, Khatana, Laley, Khepar, Meelu, and Sangoo. The Rajput are second most numerous of the major ethnic groups.  The subclans of Rajputs are the Thakyals, Ghakhars, and Dhumals. The Kashmiri tribe's main clans in Nakyal include the Butt and Lone.  They are the descendants of Kashmiri workmen who migrated to the plains of Punjab from the Kashmir Valley in the 16th and 17th centuries.  The fourth major tribe is the Malik.

Kotli District
Tehsils of Kotli District